Gareth Simon Shaw (born  14 February 1982) in Auckland, New Zealand, played for the New Zealand cricket team in the Under-19 Cricket World Cup in 2000. He later played both first-class and List A cricket for Auckland and Otago.

See also
 List of Otago representative cricketers
 List of Auckland representative cricketers

References

1982 births
New Zealand cricketers
Auckland cricketers
Otago cricketers
Living people